Canal 6 (Honduras) is a television station in San Pedro Sula, Honduras, that has been broadcasting since June 27, 1977.

References

External links
Official site
Canal 6 Live on Honduras 504
Canal6 Noti6 Live on Hondu.TV

Television in Honduras
Spanish-language television stations
Television channels and stations established in 1977
Mass media in San Pedro Sula
1977 establishments in Honduras